Miss Hobbs is a 1920 American silent comedy film directed by Donald Crisp and written by Elmer Blaney Harris. The film stars Wanda Hawley, Harrison Ford, Helen Jerome Eddy, Walter Hiers, Julanne Johnston, and Emily Chichester. The film was released on May 19, 1920, by Realart Pictures Corporation.

Plot
According to a contemporary newspaper, the story concerns a "man-hater" falling in love.

Cast         
Wanda Hawley as Miss Hobbs
Harrison Ford as Wolff Kingsearl
Helen Jerome Eddy as Beulah Hackett
Walter Hiers as George Jessup
Julanne Johnston as Millicent Farey 
Emily Chichester as Alice Joy
Frances Raymond as Mrs. Kingsearl
Jack Mulhall as Percy Hackett

References

External links

1920 films
1920s English-language films
Silent American comedy films
1920 comedy films
Films based on works by Jerome K. Jerome
Films directed by Donald Crisp
American silent feature films
American black-and-white films
1920s American films